Kevin Gleason (born 7 April 1987) is an American racing driver currently competing in the TCR International Series. He made his debut in 2015.

Racing career
Gleason began his career in 2010 in the Volkswagen Jetta TDI Cup, ending 6th in the standings. He switched to the Continental Tire Sports Car Challenge in 2011, he won one race and finished 8th in the championship standings that year. He stayed in the championship for 3 more years. In 2012 and 2013 he had one-off appearances in the Pirelli World Challenge. In February 2015, it was announced that Gleason would make his TCR International Series debut with WestCoast Racing driving a Honda Civic TCR. Gleason took his first pole position in Sepang and his second at Salzburgring, where he also took his first victory. Gleason added a second victory during Race 1 at Marina Bay.

Racing record

Complete TCR International Series results
(key) (Races in bold indicate pole position) (Races in italics indicate fastest lap)

† Driver did not finish the race, but was classified as he completed over 75% of the race distance.

Complete World Touring Car Championship results
(key) (Races in bold indicate pole position) (Races in italics indicate fastest lap)

‡ Half points awarded as less than 75% of race distance was completed.

References

External links
 
 

1987 births
Living people
Racing drivers from Pennsylvania
TCR International Series drivers
Sportspeople from Johnstown, Pennsylvania
Nürburgring 24 Hours drivers
24H Series drivers
World Touring Car Championship drivers
Craft-Bamboo Racing drivers